In Hong Kong, geographical constituencies, as opposed to functional constituencies, are elected by all eligible voters according to geographically demarcated constituencies. There are currently 5 geographical constituencies in Hong Kong, returning 35 members to the Legislative Council.  Following the 2021 electoral reforms passed by the Standing Committee of the mainland National People's Congress, the number of members returned by geographical constituencies would be lowered to 20, while the total number of seats in the Legislative Council would be increased to 90.

History 
Geographical constituencies (GC) were first introduced in Hong Kong's first legislative election with direct elections in 1991. 18 constituencies, each returning 2 members using plurality block voting was created for the 1991 election. Under Chris Patten's electoral reform, single-member constituencies were introduced for geographical constituencies in the 1995 election. After the transfer of sovereignty in 1997, the Provisional Legislative Council enacted the Legislative Council Ordinance (Cap. 542) which stipulated the use of party-list proportional representation with seats apportioned by the largest remainder method under the Hare Quota. Between 1998 and 2016, 5 geographical constituencies were established returned by proportional representation with 3-9 seats each:

In 2010, the Government's motion for amending Annex II of the Basic Law was passed. As a result, 5 new seats were added to Geographical Constituencies, making a total of 35.

Changes to electoral system 
The following table summarises the changes to the electoral system of Geographical Constituencies since 1991:

Changes to districting 
The following table charts the evolution of districting of geographical constituencies of the LegCo:

2021 electoral reform 
20 seats of the Legislative Council are returned by geographical constituencies (GC) through single non-transferable vote with a district magnitude of 2 ("binomial system"). The binomial system was instituted by the Standing Committee of the National People's Congress in its amendment to Annex 2 of the Basic Law on 30 March 2021. 

The proportional representation system used between 1998 and 2016 was scrapped. The reduction of the number of members returned by geographic constituencies has been described as "significantly curbing democratic representation in Hong Kong's institutions". These changes have been described as a shift in power away from Hong Kong's urban core and towards the outer, less densely-populated regions closer to mainland China, where pro-Beijing candidates tend to fare better.

10 geographical constituencies were established for the 2021 election:

See also
 Elections in Hong Kong
 Hong Kong legislative elections
 List of constituencies of Hong Kong
 Party-list proportional representation

References

Politics of Hong Kong
Legislative election
Legislative Council of Hong Kong
Constituencies